Equinox is a 1992 film written and directed by Alan Rudolph.  It stars Matthew Modine in dual roles, along with Lara Flynn Boyle, Marisa Tomei and Fred Ward. The film was shot in Minnesota and Utah and is set in the fictional urban city of Empire. It was nominated for four Independent Spirit Awards.

Plot

Henry Petosa and Freddy Ace are identical twins living in the fictional city of Empire with no knowledge of each other, separated at birth and placed for adoption.

Henry is a shy garage mechanic. He lives in a slum and loves Beverly Franks, his best friend's sister. He also baby-sits for his neighbor Rosie, a prostitute.

Freddy is a driver for Mr. Paris, a gangster. He is slick and self-confident, married to a materialistic woman named Sharon.

One day, a young woman named Sonya Kirk who works in a morgue accidentally comes across a letter indicating that the twins are actually the offspring of European nobility and owed a large sum of inheritance money. Sonya decides to play amateur detective and track them down.

It all leads to a confrontation between the surprised twins in a restaurant, a shootout and a final scene high above the Grand Canyon.

Principal cast

Twin child actors Jasen and Jereme Kane play the young version of Modine's characters, as well as appearing as the twin children in the restaurant at the end of the film.

Production
Parts of the film were shot in Crescent Junction and Moab, Utah as well as St. Paul and Minneapolis, Minnesota.

Critical reception
The New York Times movie reviewer Stephen Holden had praise for the actors, saying Modine "does a fine job of differentiating between the two without resorting to caricature. He is especially good at showing how the repressed qualities of each twin peek through their surfaces. As Henry's sweetheart, Ms. Boyle exudes the right mixture of warm-blooded ardor and strait-laced defensiveness."

References

External links
 
 
 

1992 films
Films about adoption
1990s English-language films
Films about orphans
Films directed by Alan Rudolph
Films set in Arizona
Films shot in Minnesota
Films shot in Utah
1992 crime drama films
American independent films
American crime drama films
1992 independent films
1990s American films